Frantzly Zephirin (born 14 August 1992) is a Canadian soccer player who plays as a right-back.

Club career

ACP Montréal-Nord
In 2014, Zephirin played for PLSQ side ACP Montréal-Nord, making ten appearances and scoring one goal.

Mont-Royal Outremont
In 2015, Zephirin joined CS Mont-Royal Outremont, making one appearance that season.

Ocean City Nor'easters
In 2017, Zephirin played for American Premier Development League side Ocean City Nor'easters, making eight appearances.

B71
In 2018, Zephirin played for Faroese 1. deild side B71 Sandoy, making twelve appearances.

Tulsa Roughnecks
On 21 February 2019, Zephirin signed his first professional contract with American USL Championship side Tulsa Roughnecks.

International career
In June 2013, Zephirin received a call-up to the Haitian national team for a preparation camp ahead of the 2013 CONCACAF Gold Cup, but did not make the final roster for the tournament.

References

External links
Profile at Essex County College
Profile at MidAmerica Nazarene
Profile at Tulsa Roughnecks

1992 births
Living people
Association football defenders
Canadian soccer players
Haitian footballers
Soccer players from Montreal
Canadian expatriate soccer players
Haitian expatriate footballers
Expatriate soccer players in the United States
Canadian expatriate sportspeople in the United States
Haitian expatriate sportspeople in the United States
Expatriate footballers in the Faroe Islands
Canadian expatriate sportspeople in Denmark
Haitian expatriate sportspeople in Denmark
Ocean City Nor'easters players
B71 Sandoy players
FC Tulsa players
Première ligue de soccer du Québec players
USL League Two players
1. deild players
USL Championship players
ACP Montréal-Nord players
CS Mont-Royal Outremont players